Lord George Murray, 5th Earl of Dunmore FRSE (30 April 1762 – 11 November 1836), known as Viscount of Fincastle until 1809, was a Scottish peer.

Life

Murray was the eldest son of John Murray, 4th Earl of Dunmore, and Lady Charlotte (née Stewart). He was elected to the House of Commons for Liskeard in 1800, a seat he held until 1802. He succeeded his father in the earldom in 1809 and in 1831 he was created Baron Dunmore, of Dunmore in the Forest of Athole in the County of Perth, in the Peerage of the United Kingdom, which gave him an automatic seat in the House of Lords.

He died at Glen Finart in Argyllshire on 11 November 1836.

Family

Lord Dunmore married Lady Susan, daughter of Archibald Hamilton, 9th Duke of Hamilton, in 1803. Their second son the Right Honourable Sir Charles Murray became a prominent diplomat. Dunmore died in November 1836, aged 74, and was succeeded in his titles by his eldest son Alexander. Lady Dunmore died in May 1846, aged 71.

Notes

References
Kidd, Charles, Williamson, David (editors). Debrett's Peerage and Baronetage (1990 edition). New York: St Martin's Press, 1990,

External links

Dunmore, George Murray, 5th Earl of
Dunmore, George Murray, 5th Earl of
Earls of Dunmore
Members of the Parliament of Great Britain for constituencies in Cornwall
Members of the Parliament of the United Kingdom for constituencies in Cornwall
UK MPs 1801–1802
UK MPs who inherited peerages
UK MPs who were granted peerages
British MPs 1796–1800
George
Peers of the United Kingdom created by William IV